This list of American films of 1917 is a compilation of American films released in 1917.

A–B

C–D

E–F

G–H

I–J

K–L

M–N

O–P

Q–R

S

T

U–V

W–Z

Short films

See also 
 1917 in the United States

References

External links 

 1917 films at the Internet Movie Database

1917
Films
Lists of 1917 films by country or language
1910s in American cinema